The Municipal Library of Prague is one of the largest libraries in Prague, Czech Republic.

The oldest item in the library's collections is a print of the Prague Bible from 1488.

References

External links 

Libraries in the Czech Republic
Libraries established in 1891